Leon A. Boutwell (October 3, 1892 – October 3, 1969) was a professional football player who played in the National Football League during the 1922 and 1923 seasons. He joined the NFL's Oorang Indians. The Indians were a team based in LaRue, Ohio, composed only of Native Americans, and coached by Jim Thorpe. Lo was a Chippewa and made his start with the team at age 29. He recorded an interception in 1923.

Boutwell attended high school at Mechanicsburg Academy, located in Mechanicsburg, Pennsylvania. After graduation, he played college football at the Carlisle Indian School.

When asked about how white audiences viewed the Indians, Boutwell explained:
"White people had this misconception about Indians. They thought they were all wild men, even though almost all of us had been to college and were generally more civilized than they were. Well, it was a dandy excuse to raise hell and get away with it when the mood struck us. Since we were Indians we could get away with things the whites couldn't. Don't think we didn't take advantage of it."

References

Uniform Numbers of the NFL

Notes

1892 births
Native American players of American football
Players of American football from North Dakota
Carlisle Indians football players
Oorang Indians players
1969 deaths
People from Grand Forks County, North Dakota